Claude Felton Virden (born November 25, 1947) is a former American basketball player from Akron, Ohio.

Career
Virden played college basketball for Murray State University. Virden was drafted by the Seattle SuperSonics in the 1970 NBA Draft and by the Kentucky Colonels in the 1970 American Basketball Association draft.

After a stint in the United States Army, Virden signed with the Kentucky Colonels.  Virden played for part of the 1972–73 season for the Colonels, averaging 9.9 points per game as the team made it to the ABA Finals before losing the championship to the Indiana Pacers 4 games to 3.  A knee injury ended Virden's season and mediocre career.

References

1947 births
Living people
American men's basketball players
Basketball players from Akron, Ohio
Kentucky Colonels draft picks
Kentucky Colonels players
Murray State Racers men's basketball players
Seattle SuperSonics draft picks
United States Army soldiers